Charles Kurzman is a Professor of Sociology at University of North Carolina at Chapel Hill who specializes in Middle East and Islamic studies.

Education and employment
After completing his B.A. at Harvard University in 1986, he completed his M.A. and PhD. at University of California, Berkeley in 1997 and 1992 respectively. He has been affiliated with University of North Carolina at Chapel Hill since 1998.

Books
 The Missing Martyrs: Why There Are So Few Muslim Terrorists (2011)
 Democracy Denied, 1905-1915: Intellectuals and the Fate of Democracy (2008)
 The Unthinkable Revolution in Iran (2004)
 Modernist Islam, 1840-1940: A Sourcebook (2002)
 Liberal Islam: A Sourcebook (1998)

References

External links
Homepage at the University of North Carolina at Chapel Hill
Official CV, containing links to many of his articles

Living people
Year of birth missing (living people)
American sociologists
University of North Carolina at Chapel Hill faculty
Harvard University alumni
University of California, Berkeley alumni